Phil McNulty is a Liverpool-born sports journalist. He has been BBC Sport’s chief football writer since July 2000. McNulty attended Roman Catholic secondary school De La Salle Grammar in Liverpool. He covered the FIFA World Cups for the BBC in Japan and South Korea (2002), Germany (2006) and South Africa (2010). He also does sports casting and analysis for BBC Radio on BBC Radio 5 Live, BBC Radio 4 and BBC Radio World Service. McNulty was ranked by a (UK) Press Gazette poll among Britain’s top 50 sports journalists; Andy Stokes commenting that "McNulty is the Proust of the back pages". McNulty wrote 449 articles from May 2007 to May 2018.

References

External links
Phil McNulty on Twitter
Phil McNulty at BBC Sports
 
About Phil McNulty

English male journalists
English sportswriters
Association football commentators
Writers from Liverpool
BBC newsreaders and journalists